Cyrus Richard Patschke (July 6, 1889 - May 6, 1951) was an American race car driver who drove part of the race in relief for the winning entry in the first Indianapolis 500.

Biography
Patschke was born July 6, 1889 in Lebanon, Pennsylvania.

Early career
He first came to prominence as a racing driving in 24-hour endurance contests, participating in teams that set mileage records in 1909 and 1910.

1911 Indianapolis 500
In preparing his entry for the first Indianapolis 500 in 1911, Howard Marmon, the owner of the Marmon Motor Car Company, wanted his regular driver, Ray Harroun, to pilot the vehicle. However, Harroun had retired from driving the previous year and had no desire to return to the sport. After numerous conversations, Harroun agreed to drive, provided Marmon could hire the best possible relief driver (after the race Harroun would be quoted as saying "500 miles is too long a race for one man to think of driving"). When Marmon told Harroun that Patschke had offered to accept the job, Harroun replied "You can get Cy Patschke?" and the team was set. Patschke would take over from Harroun on lap 70 with the car in fifth place. Due to scoring confusion following an accident, the exact details of Harroun reentering the car are unknown, but it was between laps 102 and 105, and Patschke had the car in either first or second position. Later in the race, Patshke would also take over driving duties for Marmon's other entry, driven by Joe Dawson. Harroun would be recorded as the winner of the race, with Dawson's entry scored fifth (the chaos following the crash left the final results subject to controversy). Patschke's name would not appear in the official scorecard, and his contribution would largely be forgotten.

Later Career and Retirement
Patschke would not race in the Indianapolis 500 again, achieving a second place and a third-place finish in other events driving for Marmon. He retired from racing in 1915, operating an automobile dealership in his hometown of Lebanon. He and his wife Millie had one daughter, Joan. He died on May 6, 1951.

References

People from Lebanon, Pennsylvania
Racing drivers from Pennsylvania
Indianapolis 500 drivers
1889 births
1951 deaths